Knoll is a surname. Notable people with the surname include:

 Albert Knoll (1796–1863), Austrian theologian
 Andrew H. Knoll (born 1951), Harvard University professor and paleontologist
 Catherine Baker Knoll (1930–2008), American politician and 30th Lieutenant Governor of Pennsylvania
 Corina Knoll, American journalist
 Christoph Knoll (1563–1630), German theologian and hymn writer
 Erwin Knoll (1931–1994), American journalist
 Florence Knoll (1917–2019), American architect and furniture designer
 Franklin J. Knoll (born 1940), American politician, lawyer, and judge
 Hans Knoll (1914–1955), German-American co-founder of the Knoll company; husband of Florence Knoll
 Hans Knöll (1913–1978), German physician and microbiologist
 Jessica Knoll, American author of Luckiest Girl Alive
 Johanna Knoll, German rower
 Jeannette Knoll (born 1943), member of the Louisiana Supreme Court since 1997
 John Knoll (born 1962), co-writer of the program Adobe Photoshop and visual effects supervisor at Industrial Light & Magic
 József Knoll, drug researcher who developed selegiline
 Konrad Knoll (1829–1899), German sculptor
 Marvin Knoll (born 1990), German footballer
 Max Knoll (1897–1969), German electrical engineer, inventor and professor
 Michael Knoll, law professor
 Mike Knoll (born 1951), American collegiate football coach
 Mireille Knoll (1932–2018), French Jewish woman and murder victim
 Samuel Benjamin Cnoll (1705–1767), German physician 
 Silke-Beate Knoll (born 1967), German sprinter
 Stephan Knoll, South Australian politician
 Tim Knoll, American freestyle BMX rider
 Thomas Knoll (born 1960), co-writer of Adobe Photoshop and brother of John Knoll
 Will Knoll, co-founder of Parker Knoll, a British furniture manufacturing company
 Xenia Knoll (born 1992), Swiss tennis player

Middle names
 James Knoll Gardner (1940-2017), American judge

See also
Noll, surname
Noel (surname)
Nowell (surname)
Knowle (disambiguation), includes list of people with surname Knowle

Surnames from nicknames